Leonie Clara Cohn (1917-2009, married name Findlay) was a BBC radio producer.

Early life and education 
Cohn was born on 22 June 1917  in Königsberg to a Jewish family.  In 1935, she moved to Italy to study at the University of Rome. Both of her parents were murdered in the Holocaust. After finishing school, she moved to the United Kingdom to live with art critic Herbert Read and his family.

Career 
During World War II, she worked as a translator for BBC's German Service. She married Paul Findlay (who eventually became the head of BBC TV administration) and had two children, Mark and Andrea.

She retired in 1977 after 36 years with BBC. She died on 9 August 2009 at age 92 and was buried with her husband on the eastern side of Highgate Cemetery.

Selected publications

References

1917 births
2009 deaths
Burials at Highgate Cemetery
BBC radio producers
British radio producers
Women radio producers
People from the Kingdom of Prussia
Mass media people from Königsberg
Jewish emigrants from Nazi Germany to Italy
Italian emigrants to the United Kingdom